Tuen Mun Swimming Pool may refer to:

 Tuen Mun Swimming Pool (aquatics centre), one of the aquatics centres in the New Territories, Hong Kong
 Tuen Mun Swimming Pool stop, a light rail transit stop named after the swimming pool

Sport in Tuen Mun District